Room No. 9 is a 2018 South Korean television series starring Kim Hee-sun, Kim Hae-sook and Kim Young-kwang. It aired on tvN's Saturdays and Sundays at 21:00 (KST) time slot, from October 6 to November 25, 2018.

Synopsis
The story of two women whose fate is switched as they exchange bodies, and a man who holds the key to that fate.

Cast

Main
 Kim Hee-sun as Eulji Hae-yi, a beautiful but manipulative lawyer who has a 100 percent success rate in court.
 Kim Hae-sook as Jang Hwa-sa, a death-row convict who is the infamous killer behind a poison murder case.
 Kim Young-kwang as Gi Yoo-jin / young (real) Gi San, Hae-yi's boyfriend who is a family doctor. He seems to be smart and gentle but he hides an inner dark side.

Supporting
 Lee Geung-young as Gi San, Yoo-jin's half-brother who hides a secret from his past.
 Oh Dae-hwan as Oh Bong-sam, an investigator.
 Kim Si-eun as Kim Hye-sun	
 Jung Jae-won as Gi Chang-sung, Gi San's son who lives a lawless lifestyle.
Kim Jae-hwa as Kam Mi-ran
 Jung Won-jong as Ma Hyun-chul
 Im Won-hee as Bang Sang-soo
 Jung Yeon-joo as Han Hyun-hee
 Kang Shin-il as Eulji Sung
 Son Sook as Jang Hwa-sa's mother
 Son Byong-ho as Kim Jong-soo
 Min Sung-wook as So Young-chul

Special appearance
 Yoon Park as Chu Young-bae
 Song Yoon-ah as Park Hyun-jung

Original soundtrack

Part 1

Part 2

Viewership

References

External links
  
 Room No. 9 at Studio Dragon 
 Room No. 9 at Kim Jong-hak Production 
 
 

Korean-language television shows
TVN (South Korean TV channel) television dramas
2018 South Korean television series debuts
2018 South Korean television series endings
South Korean mystery television series
South Korean fantasy television series
Television series by Kim Jong-hak Production
Television series by Studio Dragon